Naseem Begum, (24 February 1936 – 29 September 1971) was a popular, and well known Pakistani film playback singer. She was known as The Tradegy Queen for singing sorrowful and downhearted songs in films.

She rose to prominence towards the end of the 1950s, and by 1964, she had won the prestigious Nigar Awards on four occasions. Despite originally being billed as a Second Noor Jehan, Naseem Begum quickly carved out her own successful niche in the Pakistani film industry.

She was the original singer of the popular song "Aye Rahe Haq Ke Shaheedo".

Early life
Naseem Begum was born in the city of Amritsar, British India, in 1936. She acquired her musical training from the classical singer Mukhtar Begum, the elder sister of the renowned ghazal vocalist Farida Khanum.

Career
Her first film, as a playback singer, was music director Ghulam Ahmed Chishti composed Guddi Gudda (1956). In 1958, the music composer Mian Sheharyar was greatly impressed by her vocal range, and gave her the opportunity to sing for his film Begunah (1958). 

Naseem Begum immediately achieved success with her song "Nainon mein jal bhar aayey", which became one of the most popular tracks of the 1950s. She gained popularity after singing memorable duets with famous playback singer Ahmed Rushdi.

Personal life
Naseem married a book publisher named Deen Mohammad at Lahore and had five children but her six youngest son died during pregnancy complications.

Illness and death
She was experiencing labor pain and was admitted to the hospital, as she was expecting, and was about to give birth. However, due to pregnancy-related complications and she suffered a brain hemorrhage, she died on 29 September 1971 in Lahore, Pakistan at the age of 35.

Filmography
Some remarkable films for which Naseem Begum sang some heart-warming songs are:
 Guddi Gudda (1956)
 Kartar Singh
 Salma (1960)
 Shaam Dhalay (1960)
 Saheli (1960)
 Ghunghat
 Shaheed (1962) 
 Aulad
 Baji (1963)
 Dulhan (1963)
 Ik Tera Sahara (1963)
 Haveli (1964)
 Farangi (1964)
 Kaneez (1965)
 Aag Ka Darya (1966)
 Maader-e-Watan (1966)
 Payel Ki Jhankar (1966)
 Zarqa (1969)

In addition to these films, she also sang for many Punjabi films, some of which are Kartar Singh (1959), Tees Maar Khan (1963), Jeedar (1965), Mukhra Chann Warga and Genter Man (1969). Some big musical films on her credit are Lutera (1964), Koun Kisi Ka, Kousar, Chann Puttar (1970), Mera Veer (1967), Chann Veer (1969), Langotiya and Yeh Raste Hain Pyar Ke.

Patriotic songs
Naseem Begum had also sung many patriotic songs which stir the soul of listeners. "Ae rah-e-haq kay shaheedo wafa ki tasveero, Tumhain watan ki hawain salaam karti hain",  Mushir Kazmi wrote lyrics of Aye Rah-e-Haq Ke Shaheedo while music was given by Mian Sheharyar and vocalist was Naseem Begum for the Radio Pakistan recording in 1965. Majority of listeners still wrongly believe that Aye Rah-e-Haq Ke Shaheedo was sung by Malika-e-Tarannum Noor Jehan. Later in 1966, veteran Pakistani film producer/director Saifuddin Saif used this song in his film Maader-e-Watan (1966) in which this song's music was arranged by Salim Iqbal.

List of her popular songs
Aye Rahe Haq Ke Shaheedo
 "Veer Mera Ghori Charia"
 "Uss Bewafa ka Shehr Hai Aur Hum Hain Dosto, Ashk-e-Rawaan Ki Nehar Hai aur Hum Hain Dosto"
 "Sau Baar Chaman Mehka Sau Baar Bahar Aayi, Duniya ki Wohi Raunaq Dil ki Wohi Tanhayi"
 "Mera Bichhra Balum Ghar aa Gaya Ghar aa Gaya, Meri Payal Bajai Chhanan Chhanan Chahann"
 "Chanda Toray Chandani Main Jiya Jala Jaye Re"
 "Habibi Hayya Hayya Habibi Hayya Hayya"
 "Hum Bhool Gaye Har Baat Magar Tera Pyaar Nahin Bhoole"

Awards and recognition

References

External links
 

1936 births
Pakistani women singers
Pakistani radio personalities
Singers from Lahore
Punjabi-language singers
Radio personalities from Lahore
Nigar Award winners
Punjabi women
Pakistani playback singers
1971 deaths
Musicians from Amritsar
Urdu-language singers
20th-century Pakistani women singers
Punjabi people
Pakistani classical singers
Women ghazal singers
Pakistani ghazal singers